The second series of Renminbi banknotes was introduced on March 1, 1955. Together with the introduction of the second series, the decimal point was moved 4 places to the left. As a result, one first series ¥10,000 note is equivalent to one second series ¥1 note.

Coins

Though rarely used, coins of the 2nd series are still valid in the PRC, and the PBC also put new coins to the market.

Banknotes
Each note has the words "People's Bank of China" as well as the denomination in the Uyghur, Tibetan and Mongolian (but not Zhuang, as the Zhuang alphabet was not invented yet) languages on the back, which has since appeared in each series of Renminbi notes.

The denominations available were:

Remark
 The ¥0.01, ¥0.02 and ¥0.05 notes, introduced on July 14, 1981, can also be argued as a member of the third series because it was issued in 1981 (Third edition period).

The ¥3, ¥5 and ¥10 notes of 1953 series were printed in the Soviet Union. As a result of the Sino-Soviet split, the Soviets started printing these banknotes as counterfeits as a part of Economic warfare against China and thus such counterfeit notes were found in Xinjiang after several border conflicts. The use of the 1953 series banknotes was halted on April 15, 1964, to be withdrawn and these banknotes were recalled completely on May 15, 1964. The 1953 series is the only series of Renminbi to include a ￥3 banknote.

Except for the ¥3, ¥5, ¥10, ¥0.01, ¥0.02, and ¥0.05 banknotes of the 1953 series, all banknotes were recalled completely on January 1, 1999. The use of the three ¥0.01, ¥0.02, and ¥0.05 banknotes was halted on July 1, 2003, to be withdrawn and these banknotes were recalled completely on April 1, 2007.

References

Coins of China
Banknotes of China
Renminbi
Currencies introduced in 1955
Chinese numismatics